The Kraft Suspense Theatre is an American television anthology series that was produced and broadcast from 1963 to 1965 on NBC. Sponsored by Kraft Foods, it was seen three weeks out of every four and was pre-empted for Perry Como's Kraft Music Hall specials once monthly. Como's production company, Roncom Films, also produced Kraft Suspense Theatre. (The company name, "Roncom Films" came from "RONnie COMo," Perry's son, who was in his early 20s when this series premiered). Writer, editor, critic, and radio playwright Anthony Boucher served as consultant on the series.

Later syndicated under the title Crisis, it was one of the few suspense series then broadcast in color. While most of NBC's shows were in color then, all-color network line-ups did not become the norm until the 1966-67 season. It was also packaged with episodes of Bob Hope Presents the Chrysler Theatre under the title Universal Star Time.

In Britain, BBC2 screened episodes of this series and Bob Hope Presents the Chrysler Theatre under the banner of Impact.

Overview 
Ben Cooper, Richard Crenna, John Forsythe, Ron Foster, Vivi Janiss, Brad Johnson, Jack Kelly, Robert Loggia, Ida Lupino, Martin Milner, Ellen McRae (who later changed her name to "Ellen Burstyn" and appeared as twin sisters in "The Deep End" with Clu Gulager and Aldo Ray), Leslie Nielsen, Larry Pennell, Mickey Rooney, James Whitmore, Jeffrey Hunter, Tippi Hedren, Telly Savalas, and Robert Ryan were among the actors and actresses cast on Kraft Suspense Theatre.

Directors included prominent names in television and later features, examples being Robert Altman, Richard L. Bare, Roy Huggins, Buzz Kulik, David Lowell Rich, Ida Lupino, Sydney Pollack, Elliot Silverstein, Jack Smight, Ralph Senensky, and Paul Wendkos.

Some episodes doubled as pilots for potential series. The episode "Rapture At Two-Forty", in particular, was the pilot for the series Run for Your Life, which premiered on NBC in the fall of 1965 and ran till 1968.

The 1968 theatrical film Sergeant Ryker, starring Lee Marvin, was a two-part made-for-television film that was first broadcast on Kraft Suspense Theatre under the title "The Case Against Paul Ryker". It also served as a pilot for the 1966 series Court Martial, which ABC would broadcast. Other episodes that were later expanded into theatrical films (initially for European release) included "Once Upon a Savage Night", released as Nightmare in Chicago, and "In Darkness, Waiting", which was released as Strategy of Terror.

Episodes

Pilot: 1963
 Shadow of a Man (1963-06-19)

Season 1: 1963–64

 The Case Against Paul Ryker: Part 1 (1963-10-10) (starring Lee Marvin; first half of pilot for Court Martial)
 The Case Against Paul Ryker: Part 2 (1963-10-17) (starring Lee Marvin; second half of pilot for Court Martial)
 The End of the World, Baby (1963-10-24) (starring Nina Foch and Peter Lorre)
 A Hero for Our Times (1963-10-31)
 Are There Any More Out There Like You? (1963-11-07) (starring Katharine Ross)
 One Step Down (1963-11-14)
 The Machine That Played God (1963-12-05)
 The Long, Lost Life of Edward Smalley (1963-12-12)
 The Hunt (1963-12-19)
 The Name of the Game (1963-12-26)
 The Deep End (1964-01-02) (starring Tina Louise)
 A Truce to Terror (1964-01-09)
 Who Is Jennifer? (1964-01-16) (starring Gloria Swanson and Brenda Scott)
 Leviathan Five (1964-01-30)
 My Enemy, This Town (1964-02-06)
 The Action of the Tiger (1964-02-20)
 Doesn't Anyone Know Who I Am? (1964-02-27)
 The Threatening Eye (1964-03-12) (starring Jack Klugman)
 A Cause of Anger (1964-03-19)
 Knight's Gambit (1964-03-26)
 Once Upon a Savage Night (1964-04-02)
 Portrait of an Unknown Man (1964-04-16)
 Their Own Executioners (1964-04-23)
 The Sweet Taste of Vengeance (1964-04-30)
 Charlie, He Couldn't Kill a Fly (1964-05-07)
 The Watchman (1964-05-14)
 The Robrioz Ring (1964-05-28) (starring Robert Loggia and Julie Harris)
 A Cruel and Unusual Night (1964-06-04) (starring Ronald Reagan)

Season 2: 1964–65
John T. Williams's theme music was revised for this season.

 The World I Want (1964-10-01)
 Operation Greif (1964-10-08) (starring Robert Goulet and Claude Akins)
 A Lion Amongst Men (1964-10-22)
 That He Should Weep for Her (1964-11-05)
 The Kamchatka Incident (1964-11-12)
 The Jack Is High (1964-11-19)
 Graffiti (1964-11-26)
 One Tiger to a Hill (1964-12-03)
 Threepersons (1964-12-10)
 The Gun (1964-12-24)
 The Wine-Dark Sea (1964-12-31)
 In Darkness, Waiting: Part 1 (1965-01-14)
 In Darkness, Waiting: Part 2 (1965-01-21)
 That Time in Havana (1965-02-11)
 Four into Zero (1965-02-18)
 Streetcar, Do You Read Me? (1965-02-25)
 The Last Clear Chance (1965-03-11)
 Won't It Ever Be Morning? (1965-03-18) (starring Gena Rowlands and John Cassavetes)
 Nobody Will Ever Know (1965-03-25)
 The Green Felt Jungle (1965-04-01)
 Rapture at Two-Forty (1965-04-15) (starring Ben Gazzara and Michael Rennie; pilot for Run for Your Life)
 Jungle of Fear (1965-04-22)
 Kill No More (1965-04-29)
 The Long Ravine (1965-05-06)
 The Easter Breach (1965-05-13)
 The Safe House (1965-05-20)
 Twixt the Cup and the Lip (1965-06-03) (starring Ethel Merman and Larry Blyden)
 The Trains of Silence (1965-06-10)
 Kill Me on July 20 (1965-06-17)
 The Rise and Fall of Eddie Carew (1965-06-24)
 Connery's Hands (1965-07-01)

*pilot for unsold series

Syndication
Reruns of the series have been shown under the name Suspense Theatre, although many prints of episodes have had the syndicated rerun title Crisis. In the 1990s, Sci-Fi Channel aired the series under the Suspense Theatre and Crisis titles as part of its late-night primetime programming lineup. Retro TV and Antenna TV, the small broadcast networks, ran the series in the early 2010s.

External links 
 
 
Kraft Suspense Theatre at CVTA with episode list
 Kraft Suspense Theatre

1963 American television series debuts
1965 American television series endings
1960s American anthology television series
1960s American crime television series
NBC original programming
Television series by Universal Television
Thriller television series
English-language television shows
Kraft Foods